Songzhuang Town is a town in the northern portion of Tongzhou District in the eastern suburbs of Beijing. It shares border with Liqiao Town in its north, Chaobai River in its east, Lucheng Town in its southeast, Luyi Subdistrict and Yongshun Town in its southwest, and Jinzhan Town in its west. In 2020, the population of Songzhuang Town was 145,247.

The name Songzhuang came from the fact that this region was mostly settled by members of Song family during its foundation in the Yuan dynasty.

History

Administration divisions 
In the year 2021, Songzhuang Town comprised 47 villages:

Gallery

See also
List of township-level divisions of Beijing

References

Towns in Beijing
Tongzhou District, Beijing